Alika Isis Keene (born 15 January 1994) is a footballer who plays as a defender for Slavia Prague. Born in the United States, she is a Jamaica international.

Career

Before the 2012 season, Keene joined the Harvard Crimson in the United States. Before the 2019 season, she signed for American top flight club Orlando Pride. Before the 2020 season, she signed for Gintra in Lithuania. In 2021, Keene participated in Lithuanian reality television show X Faktorius.

References

External links
 

1994 births
Living people
American expatriate sportspeople in Lithuania
American expatriate women's soccer players
American sportspeople of Jamaican descent
American women's soccer players
Women's association football defenders
Citizens of Jamaica through descent
Expatriate women's footballers in Lithuania
Harvard Crimson women's soccer players
Harvard University alumni
Jamaica women's international footballers

Jamaican expatriate sportspeople in Lithuania
Jamaican expatriate women's footballers
Jamaican women's footballers
Orlando Pride players
People from Mount Dora, Florida
Sportspeople from Lake County, Florida
Soccer players from Florida
SK Slavia Praha (women) players
Expatriate women's footballers in the Czech Republic
American expatriate sportspeople in the Czech Republic
Expatriate women's footballers in Hungary
American expatriate sportspeople in Hungary